Oleh Semenovych Urusky (born 13 April 1963) is a Ukrainian politician. From 16 July 2020 to 3 November 2021 he was First Vice Prime Minister of Ukraine in the Shmyhal Government, and also Minister of Strategic Industries of Ukraine, the inaugural holder of the post.

In 2015, he was Director General of the State Space Agency of Ukraine.

He is a Director of the engineering company Prohrestekh-Ukraine.

Personal life 

He was born in Chortkiv.

In 1965, he graduated from the Kyiv Military Aviation Engineering Academy and was recognized as a Doctor of Sciences. 

In 1996-2000 he headed the management of the National Security and Defense Council of Ukraine.

In 2003-2005 Urusky headed the department in the Secretariat of Cabinet of Ministers (Ukraine).

References 

Living people
1963 births
People from Chortkiv
Vice Prime Ministers of Ukraine
Directors-General of the State Space Agency of Ukraine
Independent politicians in Ukraine
21st-century Ukrainian politicians